Microplay can refer to:

Microplay Software, a defunct video game label by MicroProse
Microplay, a Canadian video store chain, subsidiary of Le SuperClub Vidéotron